Aylesbury is a housing development in Tallaght, Ireland.

Aylesbury was built in the 1970s in the area historically known as Old Bawn and although Old Bawn still exists Aylesbury is now the larger settlement.  The local church, dedicated to St Martin de Porres, opened on 9 December 1976.  Both the church and the Tymon Bawn Community Centre separate Aylesbury from the south part of Old Bawn.

Aylesbury has a local shopping centre and a medical clinic. It is also home to the 125th Old Bawn/Aylesbury Scout Group.

It has two Gaelic football fields and two soccer pitches used by Thomas Davis GAA, Oldbury FC, Aylesbury AFC and Old Bawn FC. 

It has a community centre (Tymon Bawn Community Centre).

Dublin Bus routes 49 (The Square - Pearse Street) and 65b (Citywest - Poolbeg Street) serve Aylesbury

Estates 

The estates in Aylesbury are:
Carrigmore
Pineview
Dalepark Road (houses on this road)
Heatherview
Parkwood (said by some to be in Old Bawn)
Church Grove (houses on this road)
Pairc Gleann Trasna – Over Valley Park (houses on this road)
Kiltipper

References 

Tallaght